Brassó was an administrative county (comitatus) of the Kingdom of Hungary. Its territory is now in central Romania (south-eastern Transylvania). The capital of the county was Brassó (Brașov in Romanian, Kronstadt in German).

Geography

Brassó County shared borders with Romania and the Hungarian counties of Fogaras, Nagy-Küküllő, and Háromszék. The river Olt formed part of its northern border. The ridge of the Southern Carpathian Mountains forms its southern border. Its area was  around 1910.

History
The Brassó/Kronstadt region was settled by German colonists since the 12th century. Brassó County was formed in 1876, when the administrative structure of Transylvania was changed, and was centered on the former Saxon seat of Kronstadt/Brașov. In 1920, by the Treaty of Trianon, the county became part of Romania. Its territory lies in the present Romanian county of Brașov.

Demographics

Subdivisions

In the early 20th century, the subdivisions of Brassó County were:

Notes

References 

Kingdom of Hungary counties in Transylvania